An entry-level job is a job that is normally designed or designated for recent graduates of a given discipline and typically does not require prior experience in the field or profession.  These roles may require some on-site training.  Many entry-level jobs are part-time and do not include employee benefits.  Recent graduates from high school or college usually take entry-level positions. Entry-level jobs targeted at college graduates often offer a higher salary than those targeted at high school graduates.  These positions are more likely to require specific skills, knowledge, or experience.  Most entry-level jobs offered to college graduates are full-time permanent positions and some offer more extensive graduate training programs.  While entry-level jobs traditionally required no experience, the Great Recession produced a surplus of college graduates on the job market and eliminated many entry-level positions.

See also 
 Employment
 Labor union
 Simultaneous recruiting of new graduates

References

Employment classifications